Yaypan is a city in Fergana Region, Uzbekistan. It is the administrative center of Uzbekistan District. The town population was 15,984 people in 1989, and 24,900 in 2016.

References

Populated places in Fergana Region
Cities in Uzbekistan